Maureen Mockford (c. 1940 – 2008) was a Northern Irish badminton player and bowler.

Biography
Maureen Mockford was born Maureen Perry. In 1970 she won the Irish National Badminton Championships, playing alongside Dorothy Haslam, Joan Simpson, and Pam Porter. In the same year she played in the British Commonwealth Games with Joan McCloy in the women's doubles, and came 17th in the women's singles. She played on the Irish national badminton team 18 times between 1961 and 1970. She later took up bowling, competing in Irish trials. She died in 2008.

Achievements

References

1940s births
2008 deaths
Northern Irish female badminton players